Lactosylceramide alpha-2,3-sialyltransferase is an enzyme that in humans is encoded by the ST3GAL5 gene.

Ganglioside GM3 is known to participate in the induction of cell differentiation, modulation of cell proliferation, maintenance of fibroblast morphology, signal transduction, and integrin-mediated cell adhesion. The protein encoded by this gene is a type II membrane protein which catalyzes the formation of GM3 using lactosylceramide as the substrate. The encoded protein is a member of glycosyltransferase family 29 and may be localized to the Golgi apparatus. Mutation in this gene has been associated with Amish infantile epilepsy syndrome. Transcript variants encoding different isoforms have been found for this gene.

Mutations in this gene have also been associated to ‘Salt & Pepper’ syndrome: an autosomal recessive condition characterized by severe intellectual disability, epilepsy, scoliosis, choreoathetosis, dysmorphic facial features and altered dermal pigmentation. (doi: 10.1093/hmg/ddt434)

References

Further reading